The Battle of Bairén was fought between the forces of Rodrigo Díaz de Vivar, also known as "El Cid", in coalition with Peter I of Aragon, against the forces of the Almoravid dynasty, under the command of Muhammad ibn Tasufin. The battle was part of the long Reconquista of Spain, and resulted in a victory for the forces of the Kingdom of Aragon and the Kingdom of Valencia.

Context 
Rodrigo Díaz had conquered the Taifa of Valencia on June 17, 1094. El Cid had joined forces with Peter I of Aragon later that year in Burriana to cement an alliance with the end goal of doing battle with the Almoravids. Under this agreement, El Cid departed in December 1096 with the aid of Aragonese troops to bring weapons, ammunition, and general supplies to the castle of Sierra de Benicadell. The castle itself had been retaken by "El Cid" in October 1091 to control access to Valencia from the south via the interior route. That action had taken place in the course of the operations for the "reconquista" of Levante that the Cid had undertaken before the arrival of the North African Almoravids.

Battle
Muhammad ibn Tasufin, commander of the Islamic forces, marched to intercept the combined Christian forces at Xàtiva. Throughout January 1097, from that position, he threatened and pestered the forces of El Cid and Peter I of Aragon who, nevertheless, managed to reach the castle at Sierra de Benicadell and resupply it.

Whilst "El Cid" and the king were marching north, they camped at Bairén, a place situated a few kilometers north of Gandía. The Almoravids managed to take the nearby high ground at Mondúver (at 841 meters above sea level), from where they were able to harass the Christian camp. In addition, General Muhammad had managed to bring a fleet of ships, both Almoravid and Andalusian, onto the nearby seashore from which archers and crossbowmen were able to catch the Christian forces in a crossfire.

The situation appeared desperate, but "El Cid" harangued his troops one morning, ordering them to conduct a frontal charge and assault on the Almoravid forces, breaking their center. By mid-day, the attack was in full swing. The Almoravids, taken aback by the courage and desperate nature of the attack, broke and fled the field in disarray. The chaotic nature of the Muslim retreat led many Almoravid soldiers to drown in the river which crossed their path of retreat or in the sea as they tried to reach the safety of the Almoravid armada.

Aftermath 
The Christian army was able to come away from the battle with a great deal of victory spoils after looting the Almoravid camp. After the battle, they were able to continue, in safety, to the city of Valencia.

References

Bibliography 
 Fletcher, Richard, El Cid, San Sebastián, Nerea, 2001. . 4ª ed. 2007. . Es trad. de  The quest for El Cid, Londres, Hutchinson, 1989. 
 Martinez Diez, Gonzalo, El Cid histórico, Barcelona, Planeta, 1999. 
 Peña Pérez, F. Javier, Mio Cid el del Cantar. Un héroe medieval a escala humana, Madrid, Sílex, 2009.

External links 
 The march of conquest of Yusuf ibn Tashfin: The birth of the Lamtuna-Banu Turjut empire
 Posición aproximada de las fuerzas beligerantes: A) El Cid y Pedro I de Aragón; B) Muhammad ibn Tasufín.
Gonzalo Menéndez Pidal y Goyri, Peña Cadiella con la región meridional de Valencia. Itinerario del Cid y de Pedro I de Aragón en 1097 [mapa], 1929. Impreso en los Talleres del Instituto Geográfico y Catastral para ser incluido en La España del Cid, de Ramón Menéndez Pidal, págs. 570-571.

1097 in Europe
Conflicts in 1097
Bairen
Bairen
Bairen
Bairen
Bairen
Bairen
El Cid
Bairen
11th century in Aragon